Eurysticta is a genus of damselflies belonging to the family Isostictidae.
It is endemic to northern Australia.
Species of Eurysticta are small to medium-sized damselflies, with a pale brown or bronze colouring.

Species 
The genus Eurysticta includes the following species:

Eurysticta coolawanyah  
Eurysticta coomalie  
Eurysticta kununurra  
Eurysticta reevesi

References

Isostictidae
Zygoptera genera
Odonata of Australia
Endemic fauna of Australia
Taxa named by J.A.L. (Tony) Watson
Insects described in 1969
Damselflies